The music of the American television series Twin Peaks, its 1992 prequel film Twin Peaks: Fire Walk with Me, and its 2017 revival series was composed by Angelo Badalamenti. Twin Peaks co-creator David Lynch wrote lyrics for five songs used throughout the series—including "Falling", "The Nightingale", "Into the Night", "Just You", and "Sycamore Trees"—and three songs featured in Twin Peaks: Fire Walk with Me, including "A Real Indication", "Questions in a World of Blue" and "The Black Dog Runs at Night". Julee Cruise, who made cameo appearances in both the series and film, provided vocals for four of Lynch's and Badalamenti's collaborations, and jazz vocalist Jimmy Scott performed on "Sycamore Trees". Three of the series' actors—James Marshall, Lara Flynn Boyle, and Sheryl Lee—provided vocals for "Just You".

Badalamenti's compositions have been released on four soundtrack albums: Soundtrack from Twin Peaks (1990), Twin Peaks: Fire Walk with Me (1992), Twin Peaks Music: Season Two Music and More (2007) and Twin Peaks: Limited Event Series Original Soundtrack (2017). Starting in March 2011, David Lynch began distributing The Twin Peaks Archive, a collection of previously unreleased and unused songs on his official website for digital download. In total, 215 songs were made available for download.

For the revival series, two soundtracks were released on September 8, 2017, by Rhino Records: Twin Peaks: Music from the Limited Event Series and Twin Peaks: Limited Event Series Original Soundtrack. The first contained a majority of the performances at the Roadhouse and preexisting songs used throughout the third season, and the second is the score to the series' third season, including previously unreleased Angelo Badalamenti compositions.

Twin Peaks music has received widespread critical acclaim. The Guardian has said that the original soundtrack "still marks the summit of TV soundtracks" and AllMusic reviewer Stephen Eddins has referred to it as "a model of film music ideally matched to the images and actions it underscores." The main theme song to Twin Peaks, composed by Badalamenti, also received a Grammy Award for Best Pop Instrumental Performance at the 1991 Grammy Awards.

Discography

The Twin Peaks Archive

The Twin Peaks Archive is a digital soundtrack album by American director David Lynch and by American composer Angelo Badalamenti. The album featured rare and unreleased tracks from both Twin Peaks series as well as the prequel film.

On March 10, 2011, davidlynch.com relaunched as a site dedicated to the music of David Lynch and his collaborators. One of the features of the site was The Twin Peaks Archive, described as an "open album" with previously unreleased tracks from Twin Peaks and Twin Peaks: Fire Walk with Me being released on a regular basis. Many of the tracks streamed for free on the site, set to photo slide shows featuring images from the series and movie. They were also available for purchase as MP3s or Apple Lossless files. Related tracks were released individually or in bundles ranging from two to 15 tracks each. The Archive concluded on July 13, 2012, after which the bundles were collapsed and sold as a single set. There are currently no plans for a physical release.

 Deer Meadow Shuffle
Released March 10th, 2011
 Deer Meadow Shuffle
 Deer Meadow Shuffle (Film Version)
 Just You (Instrumental Baritone Guitar)
Released March 14th, 2011
 Just You (Instrumental Baritone Guitar)*
 Twin Peaks Theme (Alternate Version)
Released March 17th, 2011
 Twin Peaks Theme (Alternate Version)
 Annie And Cooper
Released March 25th, 2011
 Annie And Cooper
 Nightsea Wind
Released March 29th, 2011
 Nightsea Wind
 Freshly Squeezed (Bass Clarinet)
Released April 4th, 2011
 Freshly Squeezed (Bass Clarinet)
 Twin Peaks Theme (Nostalgia Version)
Released April 11th, 2011
 Twin Peaks (Nostalgia Version)
 Twin Peaks (Harp And Guitar)
 Twin Peaks (Solo Rhodes)
 Mysterioso #2
Released April 18th, 2011
 Mysterioso #1
 Mysterioso #1 (Film Version)
 Mysterioso #2*
 Mysterioso #2 (Film Version)
 Love Theme from Twin Peaks (Alternate Version)
Released April 25th, 2011
 Love Theme (Alternate Version)
 Love Theme (Solo Rhodes)
 Americana
Released May 2nd, 2011
 Americana
 James Hurley (Outtake)*
 RR Diner Bundle
Released May 9th, 2011
 Mister Snooty
 Freshly Squeezed (Fast Cool Jazz Version)*
 Picking On Country
 I'm Hurt Bad (Industrial Symphony No. 1 Version)
 Western Ballad
 Preparing For M.T. Wentz
 Secret Country
 Dark Mood Woods (Full Version)
Released May 16th, 2011
 Dark Mood Woods (Full Version)
 RR Swing
Released May 23rd, 2011
 RR Swing
 Great Northern Piano Bundle
Released June 1st, 2011
 Great Northern Piano Tune #1
 Great Northern Piano Tune #2 (Truman And Josie)
 Great Northern Piano Tune #3
 Twin Peaks (Solo Piano)
 Girl Talk
Released June 8th, 2011
 Girl Talk
 Birds in Hell
 Audrey's Prayer (Synth Version)
Released Jun 15th, 2011
 Audrey's Prayer (Synth Version)
 Audrey's Prayer (Clarinet & Synth)
 The Norwegians / Sneaky Audrey / Freshly Squeezed (Solo Vibraphone)
Released June 22nd, 2011
 The Norwegians
 Sneaky Audrey
 Freshly Squeezed (Solo Vibraphone)
 Miss Twin Peaks Bundle
Released June 29th, 2011
 Miss Twin Peaks (Piano Rehearsal)*
 Miss Twin Peaks Theme
 Lana's Dance
 Lucy's Dance
 Miss Twin Peaks (Finale)
 Sycamore Trees (Instrumental)
Released July 7th, 2011
 Sycamore Trees (Instrumental)
 Dr. Jacoby Bundle
Released July 14th, 2011
 South Sea Dreams
 Hula Hoopin'
 Love Theme (Piano And Rhodes)
 Owl Cave
Released July 21st, 2011
 Owl Cave
 Slow Speed Orchestra Bundle #1
Released July 28th, 2011
 Slow Speed Orchestra 1 (24 Hours)
 Slow Speed Orchestra 2 (Unease Motif / The Woods)
 Slow Speed Orchestra 3 (Black Lodge Rumble)
 Half Speed Orchestra 1 (Stair Music / Danger Theme)
 Half Speed Orchestra 2 (Dark Forces)
 Half Speed Orchestra 3 (Windom Earle's Motif)
 James Visits Laura
Released August 4th, 2011
 James Visits Laura
 Diary Bundle
Released August 11th, 2011
 Harold's Theme (The Living Novel)
 Harold's Theme (Josie's Past)
 Laura Palmer's Theme (Ethereal Pad Version)
 Laura Palmer's Theme (Ghost Version)
 Laura Palmer's Theme (Guardian Angel Version)
 Dance of the Dream Man (Solo Sax)
Released August 19th, 2011
 Dance of the Dream Man (Solo Sax)
 Solo Percussion Bundle
Released August 25th, 2011
 Solo Percussion 1
 Solo Percussion 2 (Grady's Waltz)
 Solo Percussion 3
 Audrey's Dance (Percussion & Clarinets)
 Northwest Gulch
Released September 1st, 2011
 Northwest Gulch
 Dance of the Dream Man Bundle
Released September 15th, 2011
 Dance of the Dream Man (Drums & Bass)
 Dance of the Dream Man (Solo Clarinet)
 Dance of the Dream Man (Solo Clarinet 2)
 Dance of the Dream Man (Solo Flute)
 Dance of the Dream Man (Solo Bass)
 Just You (Instrumental)
Released September 15th, 2011
 Just You (Instrumental)
 Bookhouse Boys
Released September 23rd, 2011
 The Bookhouse Boys
 The Bookhouse Boys (Solo Guitar)
 Unreleased Themes Bundle
Released October 4th, 2011
 Hank's Theme (Version 2)
 Earle's Theme
 Hank's Theme
 Invitation to Love (Bumper)
 Half Speed Orchestra 5 (Leo's Theme)
 Invitation to Love Theme
 Invitation to Love (Lover's Dilemma)
 Lana's Theme
 Horne's Theme (also known as Josie's Web)
 Wheeler's Theme
 Freshly Squeezed Bundle
Released November 10th, 2011
 Freshly Squeezed (Complete Version)
 Freshly Squeezed (Clarinet)
 Freshly Squeezed (Flute)
 Freshly Squeezed (Mid-Tempo Version)
 Freshly Squeezed (Fast Cool Jazz Version 2)
 Freshly Squeezed (Fast Cool Jazz Solo Bass)
 Freshly Squeezed (Solo Bass Clarinet)
 Freshly Squeezed (Solo Clarinet)
 Freshly Squeezed (Solo Flute)
 The Mill Deal
Released November 18th, 2011
 The Mill Deal
 Josie And Jonathan
 The Mill Fire
Fire Walk With Me Bundle
Released December 8th, 2011
 Theme from Twin Peaks - Fire Walk With Me (Saxophone)
 Teresa's Autopsy
 Phillip Jeffries
 Back To Fat Trout (Unease Motif / The Woods)
 Laura Visits Harold
 Behind The Mask
 Wash Your Hands
 It's Your Father
 Jacques' Cabin / The Train Car
 Circumference Of A Circle
 Dark Mood Woods (Studio Version)
Released December 16th, 2011
 Dark Mood Woods (Studio Version)
 One-Eyed Jack's Parlor Music*
 Twin Peaks Christmas Greeting†
 Dance of the Dream Man (Fast Soprano Clarinet)
Released January 12th, 2012
 Dance of the Dream Man (Fast Soprano Clarinet)
 Laura Palmer's Theme (Baritone Guitar Punctuation)
 Leo Returns
 Laura Palmer's Theme Bundle
Released January 20th, 2012
 Laura Palmer's Theme (Dark Synth)
 Laura Palmer's Theme (Solo Piano)
 Laura Palmer's Theme (Vibraphone)
 Laura Palmer's Theme (Letter from Harold)
 Laura Palmer's Theme (Caroline)
 Laura Palmer's Theme (Clarinet Bridge)
 Laura Palmer's Theme (Clarinet Strings Bridge)
 Laura Palmer's Theme (Piano Bridge)
 Laura Palmer's Theme (Piano A) (TK1)
 Laura Palmer's Theme (Piano A) (TK2)
 Laura Palmer's Theme (Piano A) (TK3)
 Laura Palmer's Theme (Piano A) (TK4)
 Laura Palmer's Theme (Piano A) (TK5)
 Laura Palmer's Theme (Piano B) (TK1)*
 Laura Palmer's Theme (Piano B) (TK2)*
 Abstract Mood
Released February 3rd, 2012
 Abstract Mood
 Abstract Mood (Slow Version)
 White Lodge Rumble
Released February 10th, 2012
 Slow Speed Orchestra 4 (White Lodge Rumble)
 Harold's Theme/Audrey's Prayer
Released February 17th, 2012
 Harold's Theme (Harpsichord)
 Audrey's Prayer (Flute)
 Audrey's Dance / Sneaky Audrey Bundle
Released March 8th, 2012
 Audrey's Dance (Clean)
 Audrey's Dance (Drums And Bass)
 Audrey's Dance (Solo Rhodes)
 Audrey's Dance (Synth And Vibraphone)
 Audrey's Dance (Clean Fast)
 Audrey's Dance / Dance Of The Dream Man (Saxophone)*
 Audrey's Dance / Dance Of The Dream Man (Clarinet)*
 Audrey's Dance / Dance Of The Dream Man (Flute)*
 Sneaky Audrey (Audrey's Investigation)
 Sneaky Audrey (Solo)
 Sneaky Audrey (Alternate)
 One Armed Man Theme (Solo Clarinet Improvisation)
Released March 15th, 2012
 One-Armed Man's Theme (Solo Clarinet Improvisation)
 Great Northern Bundle #2
Released March 22nd, 2012
 Great Northern Big Band
 Wedding Hymn
 Wedding Song 1
 Wedding Song 2 ('Stranger Nights')
 Wedding Song 3 (Accordion)
 Attack of the Pine Weasel
 Great Northern Piano Tune #4
 Twin Peaks Theme (Harp)
 Ben's Battle
Released March 29th, 2012
 Ben's Battle
 Ben's Battle (Solo Percussion)
 Ben's Battle (Solo Flute)*
 Ben's Battle (Solo Trumpet)
 Ben's Lament
 Black Lodge Bundle
Released April 6th, 2012
 Half Speed Orchestra 4 (Dugpas)
 Half Speed Orchestra 6 (Bob's Dance / Back To Missoula)
 Half Speed Orchestra 7*
 The Culmination
 Distant Train
 Laura's Dark Boogie (Clean)
 The Red Room
 Love Theme (Dark)
Released April 12th, 2012
 Love Theme (Dark)
 James & Evelyn Bundle
Released April 19th, 2012
 James and Evelyn
 Eveyln's Mourning
 Eveyln's Mourning (Extended)*
 La Speranza
 Trail Mix*
 Dark Intro Bundle
Released May 3rd, 2012. All tracks were unused in the show or film.
 Dark Intro #1
 Dark Intro #2
 Dark Intro #3
 Dark Intro #4
 Dark Intro #5
 Dark Intro #6
 Packard's Theme
Released May 10th, 2012
 Packard's Theme
 The Mill Dirge
 Odds and Ends Vol. 1
Released May 31st, 2012
 Jean Renault's Theme (Solo Bass Clarinet)
 One-Eyed Jack's Country
 Dick Tremayne's Swing (Screen Edit)
 Dick Tremayne's Swing
 Llama Country
 'Such Stuff as Dreams Are Made Of'
 Earle's Theme (Audrey's Walk)
 Leo Attacks Bobby
 The Pink Room (Extended Version)
 Odds and Ends Vol. 2
Released June 14th, 2012
 Half Heart (Solo)
 Dance of the Dream Man (Original)
 Great Northern Piano Tune #2 (Full Version)
 One Armed Man's Theme & Jean Renault's Theme (TV Mix)
 Audrey (TV Version)
 Voice Of Love (Slow)
 Log Lady Presence
 Odds and Ends Vol. 3
Released June 28th, 2012
 Love Theme (Light)
 Wheeler's Theme (Take 2)
 Solo Percussion 4
 Freshly Squeezed (Fast Cool Jazz Version 2 Clean)
 Solo Percussion (Arbitrary Cymbals)
 You Killed Mike
 An Ending - Demos and More
Released July 12, 2012. All tracks were unused in the show or film.
 Falling into Love Theme (Demo)
 Love Theme Slower And Darker (Demo)
 Slow Cool Jazz (Demo)
 Chinese Theme (Demo)
 Wide Vibrato Augmented Chords (Demo)
 Night Walk (Demo)
 Low Wide and Beautiful (Demo)
 Wide Vibrato Mood to Falling (Demo)
 Love Theme to Falling (Demo)
 Love Theme Light (Demo)
 Questions in a World of Blue (Demo)
 Love Theme from 'On The Air' (Take 4)
 Love Theme from 'On The Air' (Slow Jazz Version)
 Love Theme from 'On The Air' (Clarinet Strings)

 *: unused in series or film
 †: used as promotional bumper

A number of changes were made over the period between each bundle's individual release and the final version:
The Diary Bundle originally mistitled "Laura Palmer's Theme (Guardian Angel Version)" as "Laura Palmer's Theme (Letter From Harold)"; that version was later released in the Laura Palmer's Theme Bundle.
The Laura Palmer's Theme Bundle included an extra track, Piano A TK4, which was a duplicate of the previous track. It was later removed and Piano A TK5 was renamed.
"Evelyn's Mourning (Extended)" was found to have been a mislabelled mix that included components of "Laura Palmer's Theme (Solo Piano)". It was replaced with the correct version.
"Dick Tremayne's Swing (Screen Edit)" was found to have been a fanmade edit, and removed.
"Love Theme (Light)" was discovered to be a clip of "Love Theme (Dark)".
"Freshly Squeezed (Fast Cool Jazz Clarinet)" was found to be a duplicate of "Dance of the Dream Man (Fast Soprano Clarinet)", and was removed.
For the final release, "Harold's Theme (Josie's Past)" was moved from its original placement in the Diary Bundle to the end of the Unreleased Themes Bundle.

Cover versions
American experimental band Xiu Xiu covered tracks off the soundtrack on its 2016 cover album, Xiu Xiu Plays the Music of Twin Peaks.

References

Bibliography
Kathryn Kalinak, "Disturbing the Guests with This Racket: Music and Twin Peaks", in David Livery, Full of Secrets: Critical Approaches to Twin Peaks, Detroit, Wayne State University Press, 1995, pp. 82–92.

External links
 

 
1990 soundtrack albums
1992 soundtrack albums
2007 soundtrack albums
2017 soundtrack albums
Albums produced by Angelo Badalamenti
Albums produced by David Lynch
Twin Peaks
Twin Peaks